Moshe Feinstein (Lithuanian pronunciation: Moshe Faynshteyn; ; March 3, 1895 – March 23, 1986) was an American Orthodox rabbi, scholar, and posek (authority on halakha—Jewish law). He has been called the most famous Orthodox Jewish legal authority of the twentieth century and  his rulings are often referenced in contemporary rabbinic literature. Feinstein served as president of the Union of Orthodox Rabbis, Chairman of the Council of the Moetzes Gedolei HaTorah of the Agudath Israel of America, and head of Mesivtha Tifereth Jerusalem in New York.

Widely acclaimed in the Orthodox world for his gentleness and compassion, Feinstein is commonly referred to simply as "Reb Moshe" (or "Rav Moshe").

Biography
Moshe Feinstein was born, according to the Hebrew calendar, on the 7th day of Adar, 5655 (traditionally the date of birth and death of the biblical Moshe) in Uzda, near Minsk, Belarus, then part of the Russian Empire. His father, Rabbi David Feinstein, was the rabbi of Uzdan and a great-grandson of the Vilna Gaon's brother. David Feinstein's father, Rabbi Yechiel Michel Feinstein, was a Koidanover Chassid.  His mother was a descendant of talmudist Yom-Tov Lipmann Heller, the Shlah HaKadosh, and Rashi. He studied with his father, and also in yeshivas located in Slutsk, under Pesach Pruskin, and Shklov. He also had a close relationship with his uncle, Yaakov Kantrowitz, rabbi of Timkovichi, whom he greatly revered and considered his mentor. For the rest of his life, Feinstein considered Pruskin as his rebbe.

Feinstein was appointed rabbi of Lyuban, where he served for sixteen years. He married Shima Kustanovich in 1920, and had four children (Pesach Chaim, Fay Gittel, Shifra, and David), before leaving Europe. Pesach Chaim died in Europe, and another son, Reuven, was born in the United States. Under increasing pressure from the Soviet regime, he moved with his family to New York City in January 1937, where he lived for the rest of his life.

Settling on the Lower East Side, he became the rosh yeshiva of Mesivtha Tifereth Jerusalem. He later established a branch of the yeshiva in Staten Island, New York, now headed by his son Reuven Feinstein. His son Dovid Feinstein headed the Manhattan branch.

He was president of the Union of Orthodox Rabbis of the United States and Canada, and chaired the Moetzes Gedolei HaTorah of Agudath Israel of America from the 1960s until his death. Feinstein also took an active leadership role in Israel's Chinuch Atzmai.

Feinstein was recognized by many as the preeminent halachic authority posek of his generation, ruling on issues of Jewish law as they pertain to modern times. People from around the world called upon him to answer their most complicated halachic questions.

Halachic authority

Owing to his prominence as an adjudicator of Jewish law, Feinstein was often asked to rule on very difficult questions, whereupon  he often employed a number of innovative and controversial theories in arriving at his decisions. Soon after arriving in the United States, he established a reputation for handling business and labor disputes. For instance, he wrote about strikes, seniority, and fair competition. He later served as the chief Halakhic authority for the Association of Orthodox Jewish Scientists, indicative of his expertise in Jewish medical ethics. In the medical arena, he opposed the early, unsuccessful heart transplants, although it is orally reported that in his later years, he allowed a person to receive a heart transplant (after the medical technique of preventing rejection was improved). On such matters, he often consulted with various scientific experts, including his son-in-law Moshe David Tendler, who was a professor of biology and served as a rosh yeshiva at Yeshiva University.

As one of the prominent leaders of American Orthodoxy, Feinstein issued opinions that clearly distanced his community from Conservative and Reform Judaism. He faced intense opposition from Hasidic Orthodoxy on several controversial decisions, such as rulings on artificial insemination and mechitza. In the case of his position not to prohibit cigarette smoking, though he recommended against it and prohibited second-hand smoke, other Orthodox rabbinic authorities disagreed. Even his detractors, while disagreeing with specific rulings, still considered him to be a leading decisor of Jewish law. The first volume of his Igrot Moshe, a voluminous collection of his halachic decisions, was published in 1959.

Death

Feinstein died on March 23, 1986 (13th of Adar II, 5746). Over 20,000 people gathered to hear him eulogized in New York before being flown to Israel for burial.
His funeral in Israel was delayed by a day due to mechanical problems with the plane carrying his coffin, which then had to return to New York. His funeral in Israel was said to be attended by between 200,000 and 250,000 people. Among the eulogizers in America were Yaakov Yitzchak Ruderman, Dovid Lifshitz, Shraga Moshe Kalmanowitz, Nisson Alpert, Moshe David Tendler, Michel Barenbaum, Mordecai Tendler, and the Satmar Rebbe. The son of the deceased, Reuven Feinstein, also spoke.

Feinstein was held in such great esteem that Shlomo Zalman Auerbach, who was himself regarded as a Torah giant, Talmid Chacham, and posek, refused to eulogize him, saying, "Who am I to eulogize him? I studied his sefarim; I was his talmid (student)."

Feinstein was buried on Har HaMenuchot in proximity to his teacher, Isser Zalman Meltzer; his friend, Aharon Kotler; his son-in-law, Moshe Shisgal; the Brisker Rav; Rav Avraham Yoffen; and next to Aharon Rokeach of Belz.

Prominent students
Feinstein invested much time molding select students to become leaders in Rabbinics and Halacha. Most are considered authorities in many areas of practical Halacha and Rabbinic and Talmudic academics. Some of those students are:

 
 Nisson Alpert (1927–1986), Rav of Agudath Israel of Long Island, New York
 Avrohom Blumenkrantz (1944–2007), author of The Laws of Pesach
 Elimelech Bluth, (d. 2019) (Brooklyn, NY), his devoted attendee and personal driver, Rav of Cong. Ahavath Achim of Flatbush, dean of Beth Medrash Ltorah V'Lhorah, and rabbi of Kensington
 Shimon Eider (1938-2007), posek and author (Lakewood, NJ) 
 Dovid Feinstein (1929-2020), Rosh yeshiva of Mesivtha Tifereth Jerusalem in New York City, his son
 Reuven Feinstein (b. 1937), Rosh yeshiva of Yeshiva of Staten Island, New York, his son
 Shmuel Fuerst, Dayan of Chicago Rabbinical Council And Dayan Agudath Israel of Illinois http://www.psak.org/

 Ephraim Greenblatt (1932-2014), posek (Memphis, Tennessee)
 Nota Greenblatt (1925-2022), Av Beis Din of Vaad Hakehilos of Memphis, Tennessee
 Moshe Dovid Tendler (1926-2021), Rosh yeshiva at Rabbi Isaac Elchanan Theological Seminary, and pulpit rabbi in Monsey, New York, his son-in-law

Another noteworthy student of his (though not in the  areas of practical Halacha and Rabbinic and Talmudic academics):
 Jackie Mason, comedian (New York City)

Works
Feinstein's greatest renown came from a lifetime of responding to halachic queries posed by Jews in America and worldwide. He authored approximately 2,000 responsa on a wide range of issues affecting Jewish practice in the modern era. Some responsa can also be found in his Talmudic commentary (Dibrot Moshe), some circulate informally, and 1,883 responsa were published in Igrot Moshe. Among Feinstein's works:
 Igrot Moshe; (Epistles of Moshe); pronounced Igros Moshe by Yiddish speakers such as Feinstein himself; a classic work of Halachic responsa. Consisting of 7 volumes published during his lifetime and widely referenced by contemporary halachic authorities. Of these, the final, seventh volume was published in two different forms, the resulting variations found in a total of 65 responsa. An additional 2 volumes were published posthumously from manuscripts and oral dictations that were transcribed by others.
 Dibrot Moshe (Moshe's Words); pronounced Dibros Moshe by Yiddish speakers such as Feinstein himself; a 14 volume work of Talmudic novellae with additional volumes being published by the Feinstein Foundation and being coordinated by his grandson, Mordecai Tendler.
 Darash Moshe (Moshe Expounds, a reference to Leviticus 10:16), a posthumously published volume of novellae on the weekly synagogue Torah reading. [Artscroll subsequently translated this as a two-volume English work.]
 Kol Ram (High Voice); 3 volumes, printed in his lifetime by Avraham Fishelis, the director of his yeshiva

Some of Feinstein's early works, including a commentary on the Talmud Yerushalmi, were lost in Communist Russia, though his first writings are being prepared for publication by the Feinstein Foundation.

Feinstein is known for writing, in a number of places, that certain statements by prominent rishonim which Feinstein found theologically objectionable  were not in fact written by those rishonim, but rather inserted into the text by erring students. According to Rav Dovid Cohen of Brooklyn, Feinstein attributed such comments to students as a way of politely rejecting statements by rishonim while still retaining full reverence for them as religious leaders of earlier generations.

References

Bibliography
 

 Ellenson, David. "Two Responsa of Rabbi Moshe Feinstein." American Jewish Archives Journal, Volume LII, Nos. 1 and 2, Fall 2000–2001.

 Rabbi Shimon Finkelman, Rabbi Nosson Scherman. Reb Moshe: The Life and Ideals of HaGaon Rabbi Moshe Feinstein. Brooklyn, NY: ArtScroll Mesorah, 1986. .
 

 _. "Jewish education for women: Rabbi Moshe Feinstein's map of America." American Jewish history, 1995
 Rackman, Emanuel. "Halachic progress: Rabbi Moshe Feinstein's Igrot Moshe on Even ha-Ezer" in Judaism 12 (1964), 365–373
Robinson, Ira. "Because of our many sins: The contemporary Jewish world as reflected in the responsa of Moses Feinstein" 2001
 Rosner, Fred. "Rabbi Moshe Feinstein's Influence on Medical Halacha" Journal of Halacha and Contemporary Society. No. XX, 1990
 __. Rabbi Moshe Feinstein on the treatment of the terminally ill." Judaism. Spring 37(2):188–98. 1988
 Rabbi Mordecai Tendler, interview with grandson of Rabbi Feinstein and shamash for 18 years.
 Warshofsky, Mark E. "Responsa and the Art of Writing: Three Examples from the Teshuvot of Rabbi Moshe Feinstein," in An American Rabbinate: A Festschrift for Walter Jacob Pittsburgh, Rodef Shalom Press, 2001 (Download in PDF format)

External links
Biography of Rabbi Moshe Feinstein
 “HaRav Moshe Feinstein: In honor of his 15th yahrtzeit, 13th Adar” – A retrospective of Rav Moshe Feinstein's life, with recollections on his character as a person.
 Most volumes of Igros Moshe are available for free at hebrewbooks.org. A detailed listing with links to all freely available sections appears at Mi Yodeya: Quick-Reference List of the Section-Contents of Igros Moshe.

 
1895 births
1986 deaths
People from Uzda District
People from Igumensky Uyezd
Belarusian Haredi rabbis
Soviet emigrants to the United States
American Haredi rabbis
American people of Belarusian-Jewish descent
20th-century Russian rabbis
Bible commentators
20th-century American rabbis
Jewish medical ethics
Moetzes Gedolei HaTorah
People from the Lower East Side
Writers from Manhattan
Burials at Har HaMenuchot
Authors of books on Jewish law
Orthodox rabbis from New York City